Aleksandr Anatolyevich Dutov (born 5 August 1982) is a Russian professional football coach and a former player.

Club career
He made his debut in the Russian Premier League in 2002 for FC Uralan Elista.

External links
 

1982 births
People from Bogucharsky District
Living people
Russian footballers
Association football midfielders
FC Elista players
Russian Premier League players
FC Olimpia Volgograd players
FC Volga Nizhny Novgorod players
FC Salyut Belgorod players
FC Mordovia Saransk players
FC Tyumen players
FC Sokol Saratov players
FC Fakel Voronezh players
FC Tambov players
FC Novokuznetsk players
Sportspeople from Voronezh Oblast